Curtis Emerson LeMay (November 15, 1906 – October 1, 1990) was an American Air Force general who implemented a controversial strategic bombing campaign in the Pacific theater of World War II. He later served as Chief of Staff of the United States Air Force, from 1961 to 1965.

LeMay joined the United States Army Air Corps, the precursor to the United States Air Force, in 1929 while studying civil engineering at Ohio State University. He had risen to the rank of major by the time of Japan's Attack on Pearl Harbor in December 1941 and the United States's subsequent entry into World War II. He commanded the 305th Operations Group from October 1942 until September 1943, and the 3rd Air Division in the European theatre of World War II until August 1944, when he was transferred to the China Burma India Theater. He was then placed in command of strategic bombing operations against Japan, planning and executing a massive fire bombing campaign against Japanese cities and Operation Starvation, a crippling minelaying campaign in Japan's internal waterways.

After the war, he was assigned to command USAF Europe and coordinated the Berlin Airlift. He served as commander of the Strategic Air Command (SAC) from 1948 to 1957, where he presided over the transition to an all-jet aircraft force that had a strong emphasis on the delivery of nuclear weapons in the event of war. As Chief of Staff of the Air Force, he called for the bombing of Cuban missile sites during the Cuban Missile Crisis and sought a sustained bombing campaign against North Vietnam during the Vietnam War.

After retiring from the Air Force in 1965, LeMay agreed to serve as pro-segregation Alabama Governor George Wallace's running mate on the far-right American Independent Party ticket in the 1968 United States presidential election. The ticket won 13.5% of the popular vote, a strong tally for a third party campaign, but the Wallace campaign came to see LeMay as a liability. After the election, LeMay retired to his home in Newport Beach, California, and died in 1990 at age 83.

Early life

LeMay was born in Columbus, Ohio, on November 15, 1906. LeMay was of English and distant French Huguenot heritage. His father, Erving Edwin LeMay, was at times an ironworker and general handyman, but he never held a job longer than a few months. His mother, Arizona Dove (née Carpenter) LeMay, did her best to hold her family together. With very limited income, his family moved around the country as his father looked for work, going as far as Montana and California. Eventually they returned to his native city of Columbus. LeMay attended Columbus public schools, graduating from Columbus South High School, and studied civil engineering at The Ohio State University. Working his way through college, he graduated with a bachelor's degree in civil engineering. While at Ohio State he was a member of the National Society of Pershing Rifles and the Professional Engineering Fraternity Theta Tau.

Career
LeMay was commissioned a second lieutenant in the Air Corps Reserve in October 1929. He received a regular commission in the United States Army Air Corps in January 1930. While finishing at Ohio State, he took flight training at Norton Field in Columbus, in 1931–32. On June 9, 1934, he married Helen Maitland.

LeMay became a pursuit pilot with his first duty station at Selfridge Field with the 27th Pursuit Squadron. After having served in various assignments in fighter operations, LeMay transferred to bomber aircraft in 1937. While stationed in Hawaii, he became one of the first members of the Air Corps to receive specialized training in aerial navigation. In August 1937, as navigator under pilot and commander Caleb V. Haynes on a Boeing B-17 Flying Fortress, he helped locate the battleship  despite being given the wrong coordinates by Navy personnel, in exercises held in misty conditions off California, after which the group of B-17s bombed it with water bombs. In March 1938, LeMay as a member of the 2nd Bombardment Group participated in a good will flight to Buenos Aires. For this flight, the 2nd Bombardment Group was awarded the Mackay Trophy in 1939. For Haynes again, in May 1938 he navigated three B-17s  over the Atlantic Ocean to intercept the Italian liner  to illustrate the ability of land-based airpower to defend the American coasts. In 1940 he was navigator for Haynes on the prototype Boeing XB-15 heavy bomber, flying a survey from Panama over the Galapagos islands. By the end of 1940, he was stationed at Westover Air Reserve Base, as the operations officer of the 34th Bombardment Group. War brought rapid promotion and increased responsibility.

When his crews were not flying missions, they were subjected to relentless training, as LeMay believed that training was the key to saving their lives. "You fight as you train" was one of his cardinal rules. It expressed his belief that, in the chaos, stress, and confusion of combat (aerial or otherwise), troops or airmen would perform successfully only if their individual acts were second nature, performed nearly instinctively due to repetitive training. Throughout his career, LeMay was widely and fondly known among his troops as "Old Iron Pants", and the "Big Cigar".

World War II

When the U.S. entered World War II in December 1941 after the Japanese attack on Pearl Harbor, LeMay was a major in the United States Army Air Forces (he had been a first lieutenant as recently as 1940), and the commander of a newly created B-17 Flying Fortress unit, the 305th Bomb Group. He took this unit to England in October 1942 as part of the Eighth Air Force, and led it in combat until May 1943, notably helping to develop the combat box formation. In September 1943, he became the first commander of the newly formed 3rd Air Division. He personally led several dangerous missions, including the Regensburg section of the Schweinfurt–Regensburg mission of August 17, 1943. In that mission, he led 146 B-17s to Regensburg, Germany, beyond the range of escorting fighters, and, after bombing, continued on to bases in North Africa, losing 24 bombers in the process.

The heavy losses in veteran crews on this and subsequent deep penetration missions in the autumn of 1943 led the Eighth Air Force to limit missions to targets within escort range. Finally, with the deployment in the European theater of the P-51 Mustang in January 1944, the Eighth Air Force gained an escort fighter with range to match the bombers.

In a discussion of a report into high abort rates in bomber missions during World War II, which Robert McNamara suspected was because of pilot cowardice, McNamara described LeMay's character:

In August 1944, LeMay transferred to the China-Burma-India theater and directed first the XX Bomber Command in China and then the XXI Bomber Command in the Pacific. LeMay was later placed in charge of all strategic air operations against the Japanese home islands.

LeMay soon concluded that the techniques and tactics developed for use in Europe against the Luftwaffe were unsuitable against Japan. His Boeing B-29 Superfortress bombers flying from China were dropping their bombs near their targets only 5% of the time. Operational losses of aircraft and crews were unacceptably high owing to Japanese daylight air defenses and continuing mechanical problems with the B-29. In January 1945, LeMay was transferred from China to relieve Brigadier General Haywood S. Hansell as commander of the XXI Bomber Command in the Marianas.

He became convinced that high-altitude precision bombing would be ineffective, given the usually cloudy weather over Japan. Furthermore, bombs dropped from the B-29s at high altitude (above ) were often blown off of their trajectories by a consistently powerful jet stream over the Japanese home islands, which dramatically reduced the effectiveness of the high-altitude raids. Because Japanese air defenses made daytime bombing below jet stream-affected altitudes too perilous, LeMay finally switched to low-altitude nighttime incendiary attacks on Japanese targets, a tactic senior commanders had been preparing for some time, manufacturing and stockpiling incendiary bombs for this purpose. Japanese cities were largely constructed of combustible materials such as wood and paper. Precision high-altitude daylight bombing was ordered to proceed only when weather permitted or when specific critical targets were not vulnerable to area bombing.

LeMay commanded subsequent B-29 Superfortress combat operations against Japan, including massive incendiary attacks on 67 Japanese cities and the atomic bombings of Hiroshima and Nagasaki. This included the firebombing of Tokyo  known in official documents as the "Operation Meetinghouse" air raid on the night of March 9–10, 1945  which proved to be the single most destructive bombing raid of the war. LeMay described Operation Meetinghouse by saying "the US had finally stopped swatting at flies and gone after the manure pile".

The first pathfinder airplanes arrived over Tokyo just after midnight on March 10 and marked the target area with a flaming "X". In a three-hour period, the main bombing force dropped 1,665 tons of incendiary bombs, killing 100,000 civilians, destroying 250,000 buildings, and incinerating  of the city. Aircrews at the tail end of the bomber stream reported that the stench of burned human flesh permeated the aircraft over the target.

Precise figures are not available, but the strategic bombing campaign against Japan, directed by LeMay between March 1945 and the Japanese surrender in August 1945, may have killed more than 500,000 Japanese civilians and left five million homeless. Official estimates from the United States Strategic Bombing Survey put the figures at 220,000 people killed. Some 40% of the built-up areas of 66 cities were destroyed, including much of Japan's war industry.

LeMay was aware of the implication of his orders. The New York Times reported at the time, "Maj. Gen. Curtis E. LeMay, commander of the B-29s of the entire Marianas area, declared that if the war is shortened by a single day, the attack will have served its purpose". The argument was that it was his duty to carry out the attacks in order to end the war as quickly as possible, sparing further loss of life. He also remarked regarding the morality of the air effort against Japan, "I suppose if I had lost the war, I would have been tried as a war criminal." This opinion was also reported by Robert McNamara in the 2003 documentary The Fog of War, although after the war the Allies did not prosecute any German or Japanese military personnel for bombing civilian targets.

Presidents Roosevelt and Truman supported LeMay's strategy, referring to an estimate of one million Allied casualties if Japan had to be invaded. Japan had intentionally decentralized 90% of its war-related production into small subcontractor workshops in civilian districts, making remaining Japanese war industry largely immune to conventional precision bombing with high explosives. As the firebombing campaign took effect, Japanese war planners were forced to expend significant resources to relocate vital war industries to remote caves and mountain bunkers, reducing production of war material. As a lieutenant colonel who served under LeMay, Robert McNamara was in charge of evaluating the effectiveness of American bombing missions. Later, McNamara, as United States Secretary of Defense under Presidents John F. Kennedy and Lyndon B. Johnson, often clashed with LeMay.

LeMay also oversaw Operation Starvation, an aerial mining operation against Japanese waterways and ports that disrupted Japanese shipping and logistics. Although his superiors were unsupportive of this naval objective, LeMay gave it a high priority by assigning the entire 313th Bombardment Wing (four groups, about 160 airplanes) to the task. Aerial mining supplemented a tight Allied submarine blockade of the home islands, drastically reducing Japan's ability to supply its overseas forces to the point that postwar analysis concluded that it could have defeated Japan on its own had it begun earlier.

Japan–Washington flight
LeMay piloted one of three specially modified B-29s flying from Japan to the U.S. in September 1945, in the process breaking several aviation records, including the greatest USAAF takeoff weight, the longest USAAF non-stop flight, and the first ever non-stop Japan–Chicago flight. One of the pilots was of higher rank: Lieutenant General Barney M. Giles. The other two aircraft used up more fuel than LeMay's in fighting headwinds, and they could not fly to Washington, D.C., the original goal. Their pilots landed in Chicago to refuel. LeMay's aircraft had sufficient fuel to reach Washington, but he was directed by the War Department to join the others by refueling at Chicago.

Cold War

Berlin Airlift

After World War II, LeMay was briefly transferred to The Pentagon as deputy chief of Air Staff for Research & Development. In 1947, he returned to Europe as commander of USAF Europe, heading operations for the Berlin Airlift in 1948 in the face of a blockade by the Soviet Union and its satellite states that threatened to starve the civilian population of the Western occupation zones of Berlin. Under LeMay's direction, Douglas C-54 Skymasters that could each carry 10 tons of cargo began supplying the city on July 1. By the fall, the airlift was bringing in an average of 5,000 tons of supplies a day with 500 daily flights. The airlift continued for 11 months, with 213,000 flights operated by six countries bringing in 1.7 million tons of food and fuel to Berlin. Faced with the failure of its blockade, the Soviet Union relented and reopened land corridors to the West. Though LeMay is sometimes publicly credited with the success of the Berlin Airlift, it was, in fact, instigated by General Lucius D. Clay when General Clay called LeMay about the problem. LeMay initially started flying supplies into Berlin, but then decided that it was a job for a logistics expert and he found that person in Lt. General William H. Tunner, who took over the operational aspects of the Berlin Airlift.

Strategic Air Command

In 1948, he returned to the U.S. to head the Strategic Air Command (SAC) at Offutt Air Force Base, replacing Gen George Kenney. When LeMay took over command of SAC, it consisted of little more than a few understaffed B-29 bombardment groups left over from World War II. Less than half of the available aircraft were operational, and the crews were undertrained. Base and aircraft security standards were minimal. Upon inspecting a SAC hangar full of US nuclear strategic bombers, LeMay found a single Air Force sentry on duty, unarmed. After ordering a mock bombing exercise on Dayton, Ohio, LeMay was shocked to learn that most of the strategic bombers assigned to the mission missed their targets by one mile or more. "We didn't have one crew, not one crew, in the entire command who could do a professional job", noted LeMay.

A meeting in November 1948, with Air Force Chief of Staff Hoyt Vandenberg, found the two men agreeing the primary mission of SAC should be the capability of delivering 80% of the nation's atomic bombs in one mission. At the Dualism Conference in December 1948, the Air Force high command rallied behind LeMay's position that the service's highest priority was to deliver the SAC atomic offensive "in one fell swoop telescoping mass and time". "To LeMay, demolishing everything was how you win a war." Towards this aim, LeMay delivered the first SAC Emergency War Plan in March 1949 which called for dropping 133 atomic bombs on 70 cities in the USSR within 30 days. LeMay predicted that World War III would last no longer than 30 days. Air power strategists called this type of pre-emptive strike "killing a nation". However, the Harmon committee released their unanimous report two months later stating such an attack would not end a war with the Soviets and their industry would quickly recover. This committee had been specifically created by the Joint Chiefs of Staff to study the effects of a massive nuclear strike against the Soviet Union. Nevertheless, within weeks, an ad hoc Joint Chiefs committee recommended tripling America's nuclear arsenal, and Chief of Staff Vandenberg called for enough bombs to attack 220 targets, up from the previous 70.

Upon receiving his fourth star in 1951 at age 44, LeMay became the youngest American four-star general since Ulysses S. Grant. He would also become the longest serving person in that rank in American military history.

In 1954 LeMay remarked to pilot Hal Austin, whose plane had been damaged by a MiG-17 while on a reconnaissance mission over the Soviet Union, "Well, maybe if we do this overflight right, we can get World War III started". Hal Austin assumed that LeMay was joking, but years later, after LeMay retired, Austin saw him again and "brought up the subject of the mission we had flown. And he remembered it like it was yesterday. We chatted about it a little bit. His comment again was, 'Well, we'd have been a hell of a lot better off if we'd got World War III started in those days.'"

In 1956 and 1957 LeMay implemented tests of 24-hour bomber and tanker alerts, keeping some bomber forces ready at all times. LeMay headed SAC until 1957, overseeing its transformation into a modern, efficient, all-jet force. LeMay's tenure was the longest over an American military command in nearly 100 years.

The "Airpower Battle"

USAF airpower development and LeMay's style

LeMay was instrumental in SAC's acquisition of a large fleet of new strategic bombers, establishment of a vast aerial refueling system, the formation of many new units and bases, development of a strategic ballistic missile force, and establishment of a strict command and control system with an unprecedented readiness capability. All of this was protected by a greatly enhanced and modernized security force, the Strategic Air Command Elite Guard. LeMay insisted on rigorous training and very high standards of performance for all SAC personnel, be they officers, enlisted men, aircrews, mechanics, or administrative staff, and reportedly commented, "I have neither the time nor the inclination to differentiate between the incompetent and the merely unfortunate".

A famous legend often used by SAC flight crews to illustrate LeMay's command style concerned his famous ever-present cigar. In the first known published account of the story, Life magazine reporter Ernest Havemann related that LeMay once took the co-pilot's seat of a SAC bomber to observe the mission, complete with lit cigar. When asked by the pilot to put the cigar out, LeMay demanded to know why. When the pilot explained that fumes inside the fuselage could ignite the airplane, LeMay reportedly growled, "It wouldn't dare". The incident was used as the basis for a fictional scene in the 1955 film Strategic Air Command. In his highly controversial and factually disputed memoir War's End, Major General Charles Sweeney related an alleged 1944 incident that may have been the basis for the "It wouldn't dare" comment.

Despite his uncompromising attitude regarding performance of duty, LeMay was also known for his concern for the physical well-being and comfort of his men. LeMay found ways to encourage morale, individual performance, and the reenlistment rate through a number of means: encouraging off-duty group recreational activities, instituting spot promotions based on performance, and authorizing special uniforms, training, equipment, and allowances for ground personnel as well as flight crews.

On LeMay's departure, SAC was composed of 224,000 airmen, close to 2,000 heavy bombers, and nearly 800 tanker aircraft.

LeMay was appointed Vice Chief of Staff of the United States Air Force in July 1957, serving until 1961.

Chief of Staff of the United States Air Force, 1961–1965 

Following service as USAF Vice Chief of Staff (1957–1961), LeMay was made the fifth Chief of Staff of the United States Air Force on the retirement of Gen Thomas White. His belief in the efficacy of strategic air campaigns over tactical strikes and ground support operations became Air Force policy during his tenure as chief of staff.

As Chief of Staff, LeMay clashed repeatedly with Secretary of Defense Robert McNamara, Air Force Secretary Eugene Zuckert, and the chairman of the Joint Chiefs of Staff, Army General Maxwell Taylor. At the time, budget constraints and successive nuclear war fighting strategies had left the armed forces in a state of flux. Each of the armed forces had gradually jettisoned realistic appraisals of future conflicts in favor of developing its own separate nuclear and nonnuclear capabilities. At the height of this struggle, the U.S. Army had even reorganized its combat divisions to fight land wars on irradiated nuclear battlefields, developing short-range atomic cannon and mortars in order to win appropriations. The United States Navy in turn proposed delivering strategic nuclear weapons from supercarriers intended to sail into range of the Soviet air defense forces. Of all these various schemes, only LeMay's command structure of SAC survived complete reorganization in the changing reality of Cold War-era conflicts.

LeMay was not an enthusiast of the ICBM program, considering ballistic missiles to be little more than toys and no substitute for the strategic nuclear bomber force.

Though LeMay lost significant appropriation battles for the Skybolt ALBM and the proposed Boeing B-52 Stratofortress replacement, the North American XB-70 Valkyrie, he was largely successful at expanding Air Force budgets. Despite LeMay's disdain for missiles, he did strongly support the use of military space programs to perform satellite reconnaissance and gather electronic intelligence. For comparison, the US Army and Navy frequently suffered budgetary cutbacks and program cancellations by Congress and Secretary McNamara.

Cuban Missile Crisis 

During the Cuban Missile Crisis in 1962, LeMay clashed again with U.S. President John F. Kennedy and Defense Secretary McNamara, arguing that he should be allowed to bomb nuclear missile sites in Cuba. He opposed the naval blockade and, after the end of the crisis, suggested that Cuba be invaded anyway, even after the Soviets agreed to withdraw their missiles. Kennedy refused LeMay's requests, and the naval blockade was successful.

Strategic philosophy 
The memorandum from LeMay, Chief of Staff, USAF, to the Joint Chiefs of Staff, January 4, 1964, illustrates LeMay's reasons for keeping bomber forces alongside ballistic missiles: "It is important to recognize, however, that ballistic missile forces represent both the U.S. and Soviet potential for strategic nuclear warfare at the highest, most indiscriminate level, and at a level least susceptible to control. The employment of these weapons in lower level conflict would be likely to escalate the situation, uncontrollably, to an intensity which could be vastly disproportionate to the original aggravation. The use of ICBMs and SLBMs is not, therefore, a rational or credible response to provocations which, although serious, are still less than an immediate threat to national survival. For this reason, among others, I consider that the national security will continue to require the flexibility, responsiveness, and discrimination of manned strategic weapon systems throughout the range of cold, limited, and general war".

Vietnam War 
LeMay's dislike for tactical aircraft and training backfired in the low-intensity conflict of Vietnam, where existing Air Force fighter aircraft and standard attack profiles proved incapable of carrying out sustained tactical bombing campaigns in the face of hostile North Vietnamese antiaircraft defenses. LeMay said, "Flying fighters is fun. Flying bombers is important". Aircraft losses on tactical attack missions soared, and Air Force commanders soon realized that their large, missile-armed jet fighters were exceedingly vulnerable not only to antiaircraft shells and missiles but also to cannon-armed, maneuverable Soviet fighters.

LeMay advocated a sustained strategic bombing campaign against North Vietnamese cities, harbors, ports, shipping, and other strategic targets. His advice was ignored. Instead, an incremental policy was implemented that focused on limited interdiction bombing of fluid enemy supply corridors in Vietnam, Laos, and Cambodia. This limited campaign failed to destroy significant quantities of enemy war supplies or diminish enemy ambitions. Bombing limitations were imposed by President Lyndon Johnson for geopolitical reasons, as he surmised that bombing Soviet and Chinese ships in port and killing Soviet advisers would bring the Soviets and Chinese more directly into the war.

In his 1965 autobiography (co-written with MacKinlay Kantor), LeMay is quoted as saying his response to North Vietnam would be to demand that "they've got to draw in their horns and stop their aggression, or we're going to bomb them back into the Stone Age. And we would shove them back into the Stone Age with Air power or Naval power—not with ground forces". 
LeMay subsequently rejected misquotes of the famous "Stone Age" quote. Later, in a Washington Post interview LeMay said that "I never said we should bomb them back to the Stone Age. I said we had the capability to do it. I want to save lives on both sides". Etymologyst Barry Popik cites multiple sources (including interviews with LeMay) for various versions of both quotes from LeMay. Nevertheless, the "should" quote remained part of the LeMay legend, and remains widely attributed to him ever after.

Some military historians have argued that LeMay's theories were eventually proven correct. Near the war's end in December 1972, President Richard Nixon ordered Operation Linebacker II, a high-intensity Air Force, Navy, and Marine Corps aerial bombing campaign, which included hundreds of B-52 bombers that struck previously untouched North Vietnamese strategic targets, including heavy populated areas in Hanoi and Haiphong. Linebacker II was followed by renewed negotiations that led to the Paris Peace Agreement, appearing to support the claim. However, consideration must be given to significant differences in terms of both military objectives and geopolitical realities between 1968 and 1972, including the impact of Nixon's recognition and exploitation of the Sino-Soviet split to gain a "free hand" in Vietnam and the shift of Communist opposition from an organic insurgency (the Viet Cong) to a conventional mechanized offensive that was by its nature more reliant on industrial output and traditional logistics. In effect, Johnson and Nixon were waging two different wars.

Post-military career

Early political life and developments

Because of his unrelenting opposition to the Johnson administration's Vietnam policy and what was widely perceived as his hostility to Robert McNamara, LeMay was essentially forced into retirement in February 1965. Moving to California, he was approached by conservatives to challenge moderate Republican Thomas Kuchel for his seat in the United States Senate in 1968, but he declined.

Vice presidential candidacy, 1968
For the 1968 presidential election, LeMay originally supported former Republican Vice President Richard Nixon; he turned down two requests by former Alabama Governor George Wallace to join his newly formed American Independent Party, that year, on the grounds that a third-party candidacy might hurt Nixon's chances at the polls. (By coincidence, Wallace had served as a sergeant in a unit commanded by LeMay during World War II before LeMay had Wallace transferred to the 477th Bombardment Group.)

In 1968 LeMay threw his support to Wallace and became his vice-presidential running mate on the American Independent Party ticket. The campaign saw Wallace's record on racial segregation heavily scrutinized. 

Wallace's staff began to consider LeMay to be "politically tone-deaf" as the former Air Force General made several comments at campaign events speculating about the possibility of nuclear war. LeMay's arguments that the American public had a "phobia" of atomic weapons failed to change the perception that some American voters had of the Wallace-LeMay ticket.

The "bomb them back to the stone age" comment received significant publicity but LeMay disclaimed the comment, saying in a later interview: "I never said we should bomb them back to the Stone Age. I said we had the capability to do it".

The Wallace-LeMay AIP ticket received 13.5% of the popular vote, higher than most third party candidacies in the US, and carried five states for a total of 46 electoral votes.

Honors
LeMay was honored by several countries for his military service. His U.S. military decorations included the Distinguished Service Cross, the Distinguished Service Medal with two oak leaf clusters, the Silver Star, the Distinguished Flying Cross with two oak leaf clusters, and the Air Medal with three oak leaf clusters. He was also a recipient of the French Légion d'honneur and on December 7, 1964 the Japanese government conferred on him the First Order of Merit with the Grand Cordon of the Order of the Rising Sun. He was elected to the Alfalfa Club in 1957 and served as a general officer for 21 years.

In 1977, LeMay was inducted into the International Air & Space Hall of Fame at the San Diego Air & Space Museum.

Personal life
On June 9, 1934, LeMay married Helen Estelle Maitland (died 1992), with whom he had one child, Patricia Jane LeMay Lodge, known as Janie.

Curtis LeMay was also initiated to the York Rite Freemasonry in the Lakewood Lodge No. 601, Lakewood, Ohio.

Death
LeMay resided in Newport Beach, California starting in 1969. In 1989, he moved to Air Force Village West, a retirement community for former Air Force officers near March Air Force Base in Riverside. He died on October 1, 1990, of complications from a heart attack in the 22nd Strategic Hospital on the grounds of March AFB. He is buried in the United States Air Force Academy Cemetery at Colorado Springs, Colorado.

Miscellaneous

Amateur radio operator
LeMay was a Heathkit customer and active amateur radio operator and held a succession of call signs; K0GRL, K4FRA, and W6EZV. He held these calls respectively while stationed at Offutt AFB, Washington, D.C. and when he retired in California. K0GRL is still the call sign of the Strategic Air Command Memorial Amateur Radio Club. He was famous for being on the air on amateur bands while flying on board SAC bombers. LeMay became aware that the new single sideband (SSB) technology offered a big advantage over amplitude modulation (AM) for SAC aircraft operating long distances from their bases. In conjunction with Heath engineers and Art Collins (W0CXX) of Collins Radio, he established SSB as the radio standard for SAC bombers in 1957.

LeMay and sports car racing
LeMay was also a sports car owner and enthusiast (he owned an Allard J2); as the "SAC era" began to wind down, LeMay loaned out facilities of SAC bases for use by the Sports Car Club of America, as the era of early street races began to die out. He was awarded the Woolf Barnato Award, SCCA's highest award, for contributions to the Club, in 1954. In November 2006, it was announced that LeMay would be one of the inductees into the SCCA Hall of Fame in 2007.

Air Force Academy exemplar
On March 13, 2010, LeMay was named the class exemplar for the United States Air Force Academy class of 2013.

Executive Jet Aviation pioneer
In 1964, LeMay became one of the founding board members of Executive Jet Aviation (EJA) (now called NetJets), along with fellow USAF generals Paul Tibbets and Olbert Lassiter, Washington lawyer and former military pilot Bruce Sundlun, and entertainers James Stewart (who was also an Air Force general in the reserves) and Arthur Godfrey.

It was the first private business jet charter and aircraft management company in the world.

Judo
Judo's resurgence after the war was due primarily to two individuals, Kyuzo Mifune and Curtis LeMay. The pre-war death of Jigorō Kanō ("the father of judo"), wartime demands on the Japanese, their surrender, postwar occupation, and the martial-arts ban all contributed to a time of uncertainty for judo. As assistant to General Douglas MacArthur during the occupation of Japan, LeMay made practicing judo a routine part of Air Force tours of duty in Japan. Many Americans brought home stories of a "tiny old man" (Mifune) throwing down healthy, young men without any apparent effort. LeMay became a promoter of judo training and provided political support for judo in the early years after the war. For this, he was awarded the license of Shihan. In addition, LeMay promoted judo within the armed forces of the United States.

Rank history
Training and cadet ranks
LeMay held the following ranks over the course of his Air Force career. LeMay's first contact with military service occurred in September 1924 when he enrolled as a student in the Army ROTC program at Ohio State University. By his senior year, LeMay was listed on the ROTC rolls as a "cadet lieutenant colonel". On June 14, 1928, the summer before the start of his senior year, LeMay accepted a commission as a second lieutenant in the Field Artillery Reserve of the U.S. Army. In September 1928, LeMay was approached by the Ohio National Guard and asked to accept a state commission, also as a second lieutenant, which LeMay accepted.

On September 29, 1928, LeMay enlisted in the Army Air Corps as an aviation cadet. For the next 13 months, he was on the enlisted rolls of the Regular Army as a cadet and he held commissions in the National Guard and Army Reserve. His status changed on October 2, 1929, when LeMay's Guard and Reserve commissions were terminated. These commissions were revoked after an Army personnel officer, realizing that LeMay was holding officer and enlisted status simultaneously, called him to discuss the matter and LeMay verbally resigned these commissioned ranks over the telephone.

All officer commissions were terminated on October 2, 1929, pending completion of flight training and commissioning as an officer in the Army Air Corps.

Commissioned ranks

On October 12, 1929, LeMay finished his flight training and was commissioned a second lieutenant in the Army Air Corps Reserve. This was the third time he had been appointed a second lieutenant in just under two years. He held this reserve commission until June 1930, when he was appointed as a Regular Army officer in the Army Air Corps.

LeMay experienced slow advancement throughout the 1930s, as did most officers of the seniority-driven Regular Army. At the start of 1940 he was promoted to captain after serving nearly eleven years in the lieutenant grades. Beginning in 1941, LeMay began to receive temporary advancements in grade in the expanding Army Air Forces and advanced from captain to brigadier general in less than four years; by 1944, he was a major general in the Army Air Forces. When World War II ended, he was appointed to the permanent rank of brigadier general in the Regular Army and then promoted to permanent major general rank (two star) when the Air Force became its own separate branch of service. LeMay was simultaneously appointed to temporary three star general rank in the Air Force and promoted to the full rank of general, permanent in the Air Force, in 1951. LeMay held this rank until his retirement in 1965.

Curtis LeMay retired from the United States Air Force on February 1, 1965 with the rank of full (four star) general.

Further promotions

According to letters in LeMay's service record, while he was in command of SAC during the 1950s several petitions were made by Air Force service members to have LeMay promoted to the rank of General of the Air Force (five stars). The Air Force leadership, however, felt that such a promotion would lessen the prestige of this rank, which was seen as a wartime rank to be held only in times of extreme national emergency.

Per the Chief of the Air Force General Officers Branch, in a letter dated February 28, 1962:

It is clear that a grateful nation, recognizing the tremendous contributions of the key military and naval leaders in World War II, created these supreme grades as an attempt to accord to these leaders the prestige, the clear-cut leadership, and the emolument of office befitting their service to their country in war. It is the conviction of the Department of the Air Force that this recognition was and is appropriate. Moreover, appointments to this grade during periods other than war would carry the unavoidable connotation of downgrading of those officers so honored in World War II.

Thus, no serious effort was ever made to promote LeMay to the rank of General of the Air Force, and the matter was eventually dropped after his retirement from active service in 1965.

Awards and decorations

LeMay received recognition for his work from thirteen countries, receiving two badges and thirty-two different medals and decorations.

United States
Command pilot
Distinguished Service Cross
Distinguished Service Medal plus 2 oak leaf clusters
Silver Star
Distinguished Flying Cross plus 2 oak leaf clusters
Air Medal plus 4 oak leaf clusters
Presidential Unit Citation plus oak leaf cluster
American Defense Service Medal
American Campaign Medal
European-African-Middle Eastern Campaign Medal plus 3 bronze campaign stars 
Asiatic-Pacific Campaign Medal plus 4 bronze campaign stars
World War II Victory Medal
Army of Occupation Medal with Berlin Airlift Device
Medal for Humane Action
National Defense Service Medal with one service star
Armed Forces Expeditionary Medal
Vietnam Service Medal
Air Force Longevity Service Award, 8 oak leaf clusters

Other countries
United Kingdom Distinguished Flying Cross
U.S.S.R – Order of the Patriotic War – 1st Degree
Legion of Honour (Commandeur) (France)
French Croix de Guerre with silver Palm
Belgian Croix de Guerre, with silver Palm
Ecuador – Order of Aeronautical Merit (Knight Commander)
Brazilian Order of Aeronautical Merit, Commander
Moroccan Order of Ouissam Alaouite, Commander
Argentina – Order of May of Aeronautical Merit – Grades of Grand Cross and Grand Commander
Brazilian Order of the Southern Cross, Grand Cross
Japanese Order of the Rising Sun, Grand Cordon
Swedish Commander Grand Cross of the Royal Order of the Sword
Chile – Order of Merit (degree unknown)
Chile – Medalla Militar de Primera Clase
Uruguay – Aviador Militar Honoris Causa (Piloto Comandante)

In 1972, LeMay was inducted into the National Aviation Hall of Fame in Dayton, Ohio.

Works

Books
 .
 .
 .

Film and television appearances
The Last Bomb (documentary, 1945)
In the Year of the Pig (documentary, 1968)
The World at War (documentary TV series, 1974)
Reaching for the Skies (documentary TV series, 1988)
Race for the Superbomb (documentary, 1999)
JFK (film, 1991; featured in archival footage)
Roots of the Cuban Missile Crisis (documentary, 2001)
The Fog of War: Eleven Lessons from the Life of Robert S. McNamara (documentary, 2003)
DC3:ans Sista Resa (Swedish documentary, 2004)

Cultural legacy
According to Michael S. Sherry, "Few American military officers of this century have been more feared, reviled, and ridiculed than Curtis E. LeMay." According to Fred Kaplan:Dr. Strangelove, Stanley Kubrick's 1964 film about nuclear-war plans run amok, is widely heralded as one of the greatest satires in American political or movie history. ... It was no secret—it would have been obvious to many viewers in 1964—that General Ripper looked a lot like Curtis LeMay, the cigar-chomping, gruff-talking general." 

University of Notre Dame Professor Dan Lindley points out parallels between LeMay and the characters of Buck Turgidson and Jack Ripper in Stanley Kubrick's Dr. Strangelove, including close paraphrasing of statements by LeMay.

Public buildings

 The headquarters building of U.S. Strategic Command at Offutt AFB in Nebraska is named for the general. It was erected in the late 1950s and was the headquarters of the Strategic Air Command until its disbandment in 1992.
 LeMay Elementary School opened in 1968 in the Capehart housing area of Offutt AFB and is operated by the Bellevue Public Schools.

See also
List of commanders of USAFE
Commanders-in-Chief of The Strategic Air Command

References

Notes

Further reading
 Albertson, Trevor, "A Strategy for Victory: Curtis LeMay and His Public Relations Machine", New England Journal of History 72 (Spring 2016), 33–61.
 Atkins, Albert Air Marshall Sir Arthur Harris and General Curtis E. Lemay: A Comparative Analytical Biography. AuthorHouse, 2001. .
 Craig, William The Fall of Japan. The Dial Press, 1967.
 Coffey, Thomas M. Iron Eagle: The Turbulent Life of General Curtis LeMay. Random House, 1986. .
 Kozak, Warren LeMay: The Life and Wars of Curtis LeMay. Regnery, 2009. plus Author Interview at the Pritzker Military Library on June 4, 2009
 Moscow, Warren "City's Heart Gone". The New York Times. March 11, 1945: 1, 13.
 Narvez, Alfonso A. "Gen. Curtis LeMay, an Architect of Strategic Air Power, Dies at 83". The New York Times. October 2, 1990.
 Allison, Graham. Essence of Decision: Explaining the Cuban Missile Crisis (1971 – updated 2nd edition, 1999). Longman. .
 Rhodes, Richard Dark Sun: The Making of the Hydrogen Bomb. Simon & Schuster, 1995. 
 Tillman, Barrett. LeMay. Palgrave's Great Generals Series, 2007.

LeMay in popular culture
 Albertson, Trevor. "A Strategy for Victory: Curtis LeMay and His Public Relations Machine." New England Journal of History 72.2 (2016): 33–61.
 Maloney, Sean M. Deconstructing Dr. Strangelove: The Secret History of Nuclear War Films (U of Nebraska Press, 2020) at https://doi.org/10.2307/j.ctv10sm8sx.9
 Kaplan, Fred. "Truth Stranger Than 'Strangelove' " The New York Times Oct. 10, 2004
 Schlosser, Eric. "Almost Everything in 'Dr. Strangelove' Was True," The New Yorker (January 17, 2014) online

Primary sources
 LeMay, Curtis E. "Mission with LeMay: My Story". Doubleday, 1965
 LeMay, Curtis E., Yenne, Bill Superfortress: The Boeing B-29 and American Airpower in World War II. Westholme Publishing 2006, originally published by Berkley, 1988
 McNamara, Robert S. In Retrospect: The Tragedy and Lessons of Vietnam. Vintage Press, 1995. .

Historiography
 Crane, Conrad C. "LeMay, Curtis" in Charles Messenger, ed. Reader's Guide to Military History (Routledge, 2001), pp 324–5 online
 USAF National Museum, "Gen. Curtis E. LeMay, Awards and Decorations"
 USAF Service Record of Curtis LeMay, Military Personnel Records Center, St. Louis, MO.
 .

External links

 .
 .
 .
 .
 .
 .
 . A view of working with LeMay, by his lead navigator in Europe.

 Morely, Jefferson (editor). "Where was Gen. Curtis LeMay on Nov. 22, 1963?". JFK Facts.

|-

|-

|-

1906 births
1990 deaths
Aerial warfare pioneers
Air Corps Tactical School alumni
Amateur radio people
United States Air Force personnel of the Korean War
United States Air Force personnel of the Vietnam War
American aviation record holders
American Independent Party vice presidential nominees
Chiefs of Staff of the United States Air Force
Collier Trophy recipients
Commanders Grand Cross of the Order of the Sword
Harmon Trophy winners
Joint Chiefs of Staff
Recipients of the Legion of Honour
Ohio State University College of Engineering alumni
Pershing Riflemen

United States Air Force generals
United States Army Air Forces bomber pilots of World War II
1968 United States vice-presidential candidates
Vice Chiefs of Staff of the United States Air Force
Military personnel from Ohio
American anti-communists